Hadeon may refer to:

Hadeon, form of quark related to hadron
Hadeon, List of Fables characters
Hadeon (album), 2018 album by Pestilence